Breathless is a studio album by American jazz trumpeter Terence Blanchard. The album was released on May 26, 2015 by Blue Note Records. The record also produced one single, "Soldiers".

Background
Breathless features Blanchard's new band, The E-Collective, consisting of Fabian Almazan on keyboards, Charles Altura on guitar, Donald Ramsey on bass, and Oscar Seaton on drums. The album also features Maroon 5's PJ Morton on three cuts, and JRei Oliver, Terence's son, on spoken word. Blanchard explained that he and drummer Oscar Seaton, with whom he has recorded several film scores, had been talking about an album like this for years before they finally found time to record it. Like his previous album A Tale of God's Will, this record is also a thematic album inspired by tragedy. The album title serves as a reminder of the last words said by black New Yorker Eric Garner (“I can’t breathe”) in a chokehold by a NYPD officer and explores the effects of racism and the aftermath of its devastation on societies around the world. Breathless was nominated for 2016 Grammy Award for Best Jazz Instrumental Album.

Reception
Bill Beuttler of JazzTimes wrote "Blanchard’s trumpet, of course, provides scorching firepower atop the band’s assortment of infectious grooves. It may not be jazz as we know it, but it’s soulful, sophisticated and worth meeting on its own terms. And it’s good that Blanchard finally got around to it." Cormac Larkin of The Irish Times commented "The spirit of Miles Davis would be hard for any American trumpeter in this genre to avoid, and there are certainly echoes of electric Miles, but perhaps also – intentionally or not – there is something more European here, reminiscent of Nils Petter Molvaer’s “future-jazz”, with the austere Nordic grooves replaced by the heat and flawless poise of some old-school jazz-funk". John Fordham of The Guardian noted "It’s an uneven set, and maybe too generically funky for some jazzers, but certainly has its thrilling moments". Matt Collar of AllMusic noted "Ultimately, while Breathless is a break from the aggressive, acoustic swing that has marked much of Blanchard's career, it nonetheless retains all the jaw-dropping artistry and soulful creativity we have come to expect, albeit delivered in a vibrant, electric style". In his review for The Buffalo News, Jeff Simon commented, "The groove on this disc is a bore as often as not... As for consumers of groove music and hip-hop, there’s some decent jazz soloing here but nothing you can’t hear in vastly more impressive circumstances elsewhere."

Track listing

Personnel
The E-Collective
Terence Blanchard – trumpet, producer, writer  (tracks: 2 4 5 7 8 9 10 12)
Donald Ramsey – bass
Oscar Seaton – drums
Charles Altura – guitar
Fabian Almazan – piano, synth

Production
Don Was – A&R 
Steve Cook – A&R, administration
Randall Leddy – art direction, design
Andrew F. Scott - cover art
Casey Contreary – assistant engineer
Frank Wolf – engineer, mixing
Don Was – executive producer
Gavin Lurssen – mastering
Henry Adebonojo – photography
Robin Burgess – producer
Tondrae Kemp – tour manager

Chart performance

References

External links

2015 albums
Terence Blanchard albums
Blue Note Records albums